The Union of Kenya Clinical Officers (UKCO) is the Clinical officers'  trade union in Kenya which, as of July 2012, has interim registration with the Registrar of Trade Unions.

References

External links
 Frequently asked questions  about the union

Healthcare trade unions in Kenya